= Carl Cowl =

Carl Cowl (1900-1997) was an American labour activist, Yiddish and music scholar and literary agent.

Cowl became involved in labor activism at the age of thirteen, joining the Industrial Workers of the World. Impressed by the Russian Revolution he became a full-time organiser for the Communist Party of the United States of America when it was formed in 1919.

Cowl remained a Marxist all his life and in later years came to physically resemble Karl Marx himself. When visiting Marx's grave in Highgate Cemetery a schoolgirl stopped him to ask if he was, in fact, Karl Marx. "I told her no, I wasn't, that Marx was a good deal more important than I have ever been" he later recounted.
